The following is a list of Registered Historic Places in Oakland County, Michigan.



|}

See also
 List of Michigan State Historic Sites in Oakland County, Michigan
 List of National Historic Landmarks in Michigan
 National Register of Historic Places listings in Michigan
 Listings in neighboring counties: Genesee, Lapeer, Livingston, Macomb, Washtenaw, Wayne

References

 01
 02
Oakland County
Oakland County, Michigan
Protected areas of Oakland County, Michigan
Tourist attractions in Metro Detroit